Nandipur is an industrial town located near Gujranwala, Punjab, Pakistan. The Nandipur Power Project and Nandipur Hydropower Plant are located in Nandipur.

See also
 Nandipur Power Project
 Nandipur Hydropower Plant
 Nandipur High School

References 

Cities and towns in Gujranwala District